The Embu are a Bantu people inhabiting Embu county in Kenya. They speak the Embu language as a mother tongue. To the south of Embu are to be found their cousins, the Mbeere people. In essence Embu county encompasses the ethnic Kîembu dialect (Embu proper), from whom the Embu county's name derives, and the Kimbere dialect spoken by their Mbeere counterparts who inhabit the lower reaches of the county. Historically, both were just referred to as the Embu people. To the west, Embu neighbours are the closely related Kikuyu in Kirinyaga, Nyeri, Kiambu, Muranga and Nyandarua counties. The Meru people border the Embu to the East.

Origin
The Embu are of Bantu origin.
They inhabit the southern windward slopes and farmlands of Mount Kenya. Along with their closely related Eastern Bantu neighbors the Kikuyu, Mĩĩrũ, Mbeere and Kamba the Embu are believed to have entered their present habitat from the coast of East Africa, where they had settled early on after the initial Bantu expansion from Cameroon.

The migration to Mount Kenya was occasioned by intertribal conflicts with the coastal Swahili and Mijikenda communities. Linguistic evidence suggests their migration from as far as the Kenyan Coast, since the Mĩĩrũ elders refer to Mpwa (Pwani or Coast,) as their origin, Felix Chami says "Pwani" is the Punt of ancient the Egyptians. These conflicts forced them to retreat northwest to the interior of Kenya, and they settled by the slopes of Mount Kenya. They were to refer to this location as the place of the Lord, the owner of the snow ("Nyaga") or ("Njerũ" meaning white) – hence the name "Mwenenyaga" or "Mwenenjerũ".

Embu mythology claims that the Embu people originated from the current Mwenendega grove in the interior of Embu, close to Rũnyenje's town. The mythology claims that God (Ngai) created Mwenendega and gave him a beautiful wife at Gogo River Salt Lick, in Mukuuri, hence her name "Ciũrũnjĩ" or "Nthara". Gogo River separates Mukuuri Location and Gitare localities at the edge of a ridge called Mûrurîrî.

Eminent historian Prof Mwaniki Kabeca (in his 2005 book Mbeere Historical Texts, page 105) narrates that Mwenendega took his cattle to drink at the Gogo Salt Lick and found a girl who refused to talk to him at first. After much cajoling, she spoke with him and made him swear never to tell her negative things or abuse her, as there would be consequences.

The woman's parents were not known, and it was, therefore, believed she was sent by God.

Then one day the two, now man and wife, had a ceremony, where Ndega broke his promise and reproached his wife. It rained heavily, and the floods drowned the old couple.

Their children survived and their descendants filled the land of Embu.

The couple was blessed with wealth, and their descendants populated the rest of Embu.

History
The Embu are cash crop and subsistence farmers who also rear cows, goats and sheep. A man's riches were formerly judged by how many wives and children he had. For example, Senior Chief Muruatetu, probably one of the most famous of the Aembu people, not only had sixteen wives and many children, but he was also a respected administration officer for the colonial government and independent Kenya. An entire village bears his name, and a school is named after him.

The Embu were fierce warriors who, although rarely raiding other tribes, always stood firm in defense of their territory and people. Many occasions are on record where the Embu had to fiercely repulse Kamba and even the dreaded Maasai invasions. They also rose against the British in the Mau Mau fight for Kenya's independence. The fact that the tribe was and continues to be considerably small explains their relatively small impact on the history of Kenya.

A captivating photo of Embu warriors hangs at the Izaak Walton Inn in Embu, named after Izaak Walton, an English gentleman who was enraptured by the fresh trout available in the fresh rivers flowing through Embu. The Ruvingacĩ and Kavingacĩ
013 Rivers border Embu town to the west and the east respectively and are a key source of domestic water to many Embu families.

Embu region has for long been known as having very conducive altitude and climate that produce highly superior human body system. There has however been very little or no efforts in engaging young people from this area in sporting activities to tap this advantage. However, the country's athletic team has immensely utilized the altitude and climate advantage of Embu through doing practices especially at Kigari teachers college and its environs, area that is at the slope of Mt. Kenya. These have gone on to win prestigious awards in the Olympics and competitive world marathons.

Clans And Lineages

Economic activities
Embu lies on the windward slopes of Mount Kenya. It remarkably occupies the most prime fertile lands of the Kenya highlands. Two seasons are enjoyed each year, and the weather is favourable for diverse agricultural activities. The main food crops grown are maize, beans, yams, cassava, millet, sorghum, bananas and arrowroot, among others. This, alongside the domestic livestock of cows, goats, sheep and chicken, keeps the people well fed throughout the year. Instances of drought or famine are extremely rare. Embu county has repeatedly been ranked among the richest counties in Kenya and recent demographic surveys have ranked it among counties with longest life expectancy.

With the advent of colonialism, many cash crops were introduced. For long these have offered a lucrative alternative source of livelihood for the people. The most widespread cash crops to date are coffee, tea, miraa(khat) and macadamia nuts. These are mainly grown for sale with little being processed for domestic consumption. Embu district is the richest District in Kenya

Tourist attractions
The district is home to Mount Kenya to the north. This is a tourism attraction with many foreigners and local people visiting its slopes. Numerous expeditions set out each year to scale the slopes to the mountain top. This climb is not easy and calls for great stamina and resilience. Legend has it that one man Munyao did scale the mountain to the peak and hoisted the national flag during the independence day on 12 December 1963.

Other attractions in the region are the huge Karue hill towering high along the Embu-Meru highway. Made of a huge crested rock, at the top of the hill are two unique eucalyptus trees. From the summit there are views of the far reaches of Embu. Nearby to this hill are two waterfalls close together which color the sky white as their waters fall down, then marry to form one big Ena river that then meanders downstream to encircle the Karue hill. The Kirimiri hill is also nearby. Though not open for tourism, it is home to a diverse array of wildlife. Embu is home to Mwea National Reserve. Best known for the diversity of bird species in the reserve. Ancient caves are also found in Embu, commonly referred to as 'Ngurunga ya Ngai' by the Embu natives.

See also
 Gikuyu, Embu, and Meru Association (GEMA)

Further reading

References